Bokomo Foods ("The Goodness of Home") is the largest breakfast cereal company in South Africa, and is a division of Pioneer Foods (Pty) Ltd.

History 

Bokomo Foods (Bolandse Kooperatiewe Molenaars) started as a wheat co-operative about 80 years ago and has since grown and expanded greatly to become one of South Africa's largest manufacturer of cereals. Bokomo also has a base in the United Kingdom as well as an alliance with Sanitarium, an Australian food manufacturer.

Over the years, Bokomo broke into the baking and dessert market, acquiring Moir's, South Africa's largest range of baking products. More recently, they also acquired Kwality Biscuits, the manufacturer of products such as Romantic Dreams, Munch-A-Lot, Centre Court and Vinta.

Many Bokomo products are endorsed by the Heart Foundation of South Africa.

Products 

 Bokomo Rusks
 Crumbs and coatings
 Moir's desserts and baking products
 Kwality Biscuits products

Cereals 
 Weet-Bix (from Sanitarium)
 Sunny-Bisk
 Bran Flakes
 Corn Flakes
 Fibre Plus
 Flakes Range
 Maximize
 Otees
 Powervite
 ProNutro Traditional and Wholewheat
 Up & Go
 Crunchies
 Breakfast bars
 Nature's Source muesli

Porridge 
 Maltabella
 Oats
 Instant Oats
 KreemyMeel

External links
 Bokomo, South Africa
 Bokomo, United Kingdom
 Brands and Branding

Food and drink companies of South Africa